Transvaal Park was a popular waterpark in Yasenevo, a south district of Moscow, Russia. With heated pools, including a wave pool and twisting "river" for tubing, it became one of the most popular attractions in the Moscow area and a symbol of the country's bloom of private enterprise. When the water park had been open for two years, the roof collapsed with fatalities.

History
The park opened in June 2002. At 7:15 p.m. on February 14, 2004, the roof of the park collapsed, killing 28 people, including 8 children, and injuring 193, including 51 children. Architect Nodar Kancheli, who had designed the structure, claimed that terrorists likely attacked the attraction, but the cause turned out to be a faulty design.

In a Dutch publication (2015) "stress corrosion cracking" of stainless steel fasteners or other loaded stainless steel elements was suggested as being the cause of this accident. 

On April 2, 2013 a new water park Moreon was opened on the former site of Transvaal Park.

See also
List of water parks

References

External links
Official site of the Transvaal amusement park 

Collapsed buildings and structures
Water parks in Russia
Defunct amusement parks
2004 disasters in Russia
Building collapses in 2004
Disasters in Moscow
2000s in Moscow